Surb Khach, Armenian for the Holy Cross, can refer to:

 The Surb Khach Monastery in Crimea, Ukraine
 The Holy Cross Church, Nakhichevan on Don
 The Armenian Cathedral of the Holy Cross, in Lake Van, Turkey